Stathelle og Omegn Idrettslag (founded in 1929) is a sports club from the town of Stathelle in Bamble. The men's senior football team plays in the 4th Division, after being relegated from the 3rd Division at the end of the 2010 season.

External links
 Stathelle Fotball
 Bunes Stadion - Nordic Stadiums

Sport in Vestfold og Telemark
Association football clubs established in 1929
Bamble